Phantom Secure was a Canadian company that provided modified secure mobile phones, which were equipped with a remotely operated kill switch. After its shutdown, criminal users fled to alternatives including ANOM, which turned out to be a honeypot run by the FBI.

Arrest of Vincent Ramos
CEO Vincent Ramos was arrested at an Over Easy restaurant in Bellingham, Washington on 7 March 2018. At the time he lived in Richmond, British Columbia. Ramos had turned state's witness by June. He handed over all login details to his systems, giving authorities access to his whole operation. Ramos did not know the real identities of many clients and police worked to uncover them.

Convictions
It was said to have provided "secure communications to high-level drug traffickers and other criminal organization leaders" according to a 2018 FBI takedown announcement. Its CEO, Vincent Ramos, was sentenced in 2019 to a nine-year prison sentence after telling undercover agents that he created the device to help drug traffickers. Customers included members of the Sinaloa Cartel, and the FBI reportedly asked Ramos to plant a backdoor in Phantom Secure's encrypted network, which he refused to do.

Cameron Ortis
In September 2019 the RCMP arrested a man charged with leaking information to foreign entities. Cameron Ortis was director general of the National Intelligence Coordination Centre, a branch of the RCMP that specialised in analytics. He had been running the NICC since 2016 having joined the RCMP in 2007  as a strategic analyst from an academic background in technology and crime, after completing a PhD at the University of British Columbia before he joined.

In 2018 a joint operation between the RCMP and FBI indicated that there might be a mole, the investigation led to the arrest of Ortis. Media reports have linked his arrest to Phantom Secure.

He faces five charges under the Security of Information Act and the Criminal Code.

Charges against him include that in 2015 he supplied "special operational information" to "V.R", believed to be Vincent Ramos.

See also
EncroChat

References

Anonymity networks
Cyberspace
Dark web